Pavel Chasnowski ((Pavel Chesnovskiy); born 4 March 1986) is a Belarusian former professional footballer.

Career
In 2009, he moved to FK Ventspils, but just after a half of the season he left the team, because of his limited playing time, as Aleksandrs Kolinko was the team's first choice keeper. In April 2010 he joined FK Ventspils farm-club FC Tranzit on loan, but already in June left the team. Between May 2011 and January 2012, Chasnowski was under contract with BATE Borisov.

In 2002, Chasnowski played in 3 matches for the Belarus U17. In 2004, he amassed 4 caps for the Belarus U19 side.
Chasnowski was the starting goalkeeper for the Belarus U21 team that participated in the UEFA U-21 Championship 2009.

Honours
BATE Borisov
Belarusian Premier League champion: 2011

Torpedo-BelAZ Zhodino
Belarusian Cup winner: 2015–16

Shakhtyor Soligorsk
Belarusian Premier League champion: 2020
Belarusian Cup winner: 2018–19

References

External links

1986 births
Living people
Footballers from Minsk
Belarusian footballers
Association football goalkeepers
Belarusian expatriate footballers
Belarusian expatriate sportspeople in Latvia
Expatriate footballers in Latvia
FC Smena Minsk players
FC BATE Borisov players
FC Partizan Minsk players
FC Vitebsk players
FK Ventspils players
FC Tranzīts players
FC Torpedo-BelAZ Zhodino players
FC Gorodeya players
FC Minsk players
FC Shakhtyor Soligorsk players